Buck's Pocket State Park is public recreation area located on Sand Mountain in the northeast corner of the U.S. state of Alabama,  north of the community of Grove Oak. The state park occupies  surrounding a natural pocket (canyon) of the Appalachian Mountain chain along South Sauty Creek, an upstream tributary on the east side of Guntersville Lake. The park is known for the sweeping views of its rugged, seemingly untouched landscape provided from the heights of Point Rock.

History
The park's origins date from 1966, when the Sand Mountain Booster's Club organized the Tri-County Park Authority and purchased land from a local farmer. Additional acreage totalling some 700 acres was contributed by the Tennessee Valley Authority. The park opened in 1971.

In 2015, Buck's Pocket lost its campground and its staffing as part of the closing and curtailment of services at several Alabama state parks enacted following severe budget cuts. The park reopened in 2020.

Park lore
The origin of the name "Buck's Pocket" has been variously attributed to the presence of large herds of deer, the legendary death of a buck who leapt from Point Rock after being trapped by Cherokee, and a man named Buck Berry who used the area to hide from the draft during the Civil War.

A persistent story dating from the 1940s holds that unsuccessful Alabama politicians go to Buck's Pocket after being defeated at the polls. When specifically they go and what activities they pursue while there is not specified, but left to the imagination.

Activities and amenities
The park offers  of trails for hiking as well as the scenic view from atop the Point Rock Overlook. The park's picnic area has a canyon rim vista into the pocket below. A boat launch and fishing area are provided seven miles downstream at Morgan's Cove on Lake Guntersville.

References

External links

Buck's Pocket State Park Alabama Department of Conservation and Natural Resources

State parks of Alabama
Protected areas of DeKalb County, Alabama
Protected areas of Jackson County, Alabama
Protected areas of Marshall County, Alabama
Protected areas established in 1971
1971 establishments in Alabama